Aleksey Babadjanov (sometimes listed as Aleksey Babdazhanov, born September 25, 1978) is an Uzbekistani sprint canoer who competed in the mid-2000s. At the 2004 Summer Olympics in Athens, he was eliminated in the semifinals of both the K-2 500 m and the K-4 1000 m events.

External links
Sports-Reference.com profile

1978 births
Canoeists at the 2004 Summer Olympics
Living people
Olympic canoeists of Uzbekistan
Uzbekistani male canoeists
Asian Games medalists in canoeing
Canoeists at the 2002 Asian Games
Canoeists at the 2006 Asian Games
Canoeists at the 2010 Asian Games
Asian Games gold medalists for Uzbekistan
Asian Games silver medalists for Uzbekistan
Asian Games bronze medalists for Uzbekistan

Medalists at the 2002 Asian Games
Medalists at the 2006 Asian Games
Medalists at the 2010 Asian Games
21st-century Uzbekistani people